Cristiana Ferrando (born 10 August 1995) is an Italian tennis player.

On 23 May 2022, she reached her best singles ranking of world No. 247. On 2 October 2017, she peaked at No. 302 in the doubles rankings. Ferrando has won four singles titles and three doubles titles on the ITF Women's Circuit.

She made her WTA Tour main-draw debut at the 2016 Guangzhou International, where she received entry by a lucky loser spot, losing in the first round to Nigina Abduraimova.

Grand Slam performance timelines

Singles

ITF Circuit finals

Singles: 14 (4 titles, 10 runner–ups)

Doubles: 9 (3 titles, 6 runner–ups)

Notes

References

External links
 

1995 births
Living people
Italian female tennis players
21st-century Italian women